The 1983 Bracknell District Council election took place on 5 May 1983, to elect all 40 members in 19 wards for Bracknell Forest Borough Council in England. The election was held on the same day as other local elections as part of the 1983 United Kingdom local elections. The Conservative Party won a third term in office, securing an electoral wipeout of the opposition parties by winning all 40 seats, a feat it would repeat in 1987.

The local Labour Party was riven by internal disputes, cultivated since the last election by the national split and the creation of the Social Democratic Party.  In late 1981, Labour group leader Jack Delbridge and other Labour local luminaries, including former council leader Bill Lindop, defected to the SDP, claiming left-wing militants controlled the local Labour party and the relationship was untenable. Of the 10 Labour councillors elected in 1979, 6 would stand for election under the SDP–Liberal Alliance banner, 3 would not stand for re-election, while only Denis Tunnicliffe stood again, leading the rump Labour group - symbolic of the split was his wife standing for the Alliance in Great Hollands South.

Ward results
An asterisk (*) denotes an incumbent councillor standing for re-election.

Votes for the SDP–Liberal Alliance are compared against the Liberal Party in 1979.

Ascot

Binfield

Bullbrook

College Town

Cranbourne

Crowthorne

Garth

Great Hollands North

Great Hollands South

Hanworth

Harmanswater

Little Sandhurst

Old Bracknell

Owlsmoor

Priestwood

Sandhurst

St. Marys

Warfield

Wildridings

Footnotes

References

Bracknell
Bracknell Forest Borough Council elections